M'Bala Nzola (born 18 August 1996) is an Angolan professional footballer who plays as a striker for Serie A club Spezia and the Angola national team.

Club career
On 28 January 2015, Nzola made his professional debut with Académica de Coimbra in a 2014–15 Taça da Liga match against FC Porto, coming on as a substitute in the 4–1 away loss.

On 7 August 2016, he joined Lega Pro club Virtus Francavilla Calcio.

On 7 August 2017, after helping Virtus Francavilla Calcio reach the Lega Pro promotion play-offs, Nzola signed a four-year deal with Carpi F.C. 1909.

On 16 August 2018, he joined Serie C club Trapani on a season-long loan. Trapani held the obligation to purchase him from Carpi at the end of the loan term in case of Trapani's promotion into Serie B. On 15 June he scored the first goal for the Trapani victory over Piacenza, and after that Trapani was promoted in Serie B after two years of Serie C.

On 13 January 2020, he joined Serie B club Spezia on loan with an option to purchase.

On 7 October 2020, Nzola signed with Spezia a three-year contract.

International career 
Being born in Angola, but raised in France, Nzola could represent both the countries at an international level.

In March 2021, some months after he expressed his desire to represent Angola, he received his first call-up to the national team. Some days after, on 25 March 2021, he made his debut for the Palancas Negras against Gambia, in a qualifying match for the Africa Cup of Nations.

Personal life
Born in Cabinda, an Angolan exclave, Nzola emigrated to France as a child.

Career statistics

Club

International

Scores and results list Angola's goal tally first, score column indicates score after each Nzola goal.

References

External links

1996 births
Living people
Sportspeople from Cabinda Province
Angolan footballers
Angola international footballers
French footballers
Naturalized citizens of France
Angolan emigrants to France
Association football midfielders
Associação Académica de Coimbra – O.A.F. players
Sertanense F.C. players
Virtus Francavilla Calcio players
A.C. Carpi players
Trapani Calcio players
Spezia Calcio players
Campeonato de Portugal (league) players
Serie A players
Serie B players
Serie C players
Angolan expatriate footballers
Angolan expatriate sportspeople in Portugal
Expatriate footballers in Portugal
Angolan expatriate sportspeople in Italy
Expatriate footballers in Italy
French people of Angolan descent
French expatriate footballers
French expatriate sportspeople in Portugal
French expatriate sportspeople in Italy
Angolan people of Democratic Republic of the Congo descent